Turkish pop singer Sertab Erener's discography consists of eleven studio albums, two live albums, three compilation albums, one cover album, three extended plays (EP), and fifteen singles. After graduating from Mimar Sinan Fine Arts University, she worked as a backing vocalist for Sezen Aksu, and released her first studio album Sakin Ol! in 1992, which sold more than a million copies. In 1994, her second studio album, Lâ'l, was released, followed by Sertab Gibi in 1997.

In 1999, she released her fourth studio album Sertab Erener. She was later featured on Puerto Rican singer Ricky Martin's song "Private Emotion"; this duet, was included in Martin's 1999 album. Erener's first compilation album, Sertab, was released across Europe in 2000. In 2001, she released the album Turuncu. On 24 May 2003, she represented Turkey at the Eurovision Song Contest 2003 with the song "Everyway That I Can", which earned Turkey 167 points and marked its first victory in the contest, making it the host for the Eurovision Song Contest 2004. "Everyway That I Can" entered the music charts of many European countries and ranked number-one in Sweden and Greece. The single received a platinum certification from Greece. Erener released her first English album, No Boundaries, in 2004. The song "Here I Am" from this album ranked sixth on the Greek music chart.

In 2005, her seventh studio album, Aşk Ölmez, was released. After this album, she did not publish a studio album for five years but continued to prepare and release various other works. In 2007, she released the compilation albums The Best of Sertab Erener and Sertab Goes to the Club. In the same year, she gave a concert to mark the fifteenth year of her music career and sold it in December 2008 as a live album under the name Otobiyografi. On year later, she released the split album Painted On Water together with Demir Demirkan.

In June 2010, Erener released her eighth studio album Rengârenk. The songs "Bu Böyle" and "Açık Adres" were released as promotional singles from the album in the late 2009; "Bu Böyle" ranked first on Türkçe Top 20, while "Açık Adres" ranked third. The other four songs from the album that were made into music videos also entered the national music charts; "Koparılan Çiçekler", "Rengârenk" and "İstanbul" ranked second, while "Bir Damla Gözlerimde" ranked seventh on the list. In April 2012, she released the Turkish classical album Ey Şûh-i Sertab as a tribute to her father. The album sold 78,995 copies in Turkey and became one of the best-selling albums of the year. In April 2013, Erener released her ninth studio album Sade. The album's lead single, "İyileşiyorum", ranked second on Turkey's official music chart.

Albums

Studio albums

Cover albums

Compilation albums

Live albums

EPs

Split albums

Charts

International

National

Other works

Music videos

References

External links 
 

Pop music discographies
Discographies of Turkish artists